William Hugh McDowell (December 31, 1846 – May 15, 1864) was one of the VMI Cadets killed at the Battle of New Market. He entered VMI on August 22, 1863.  He was shot in the heart. In the battle, Cabell and Stanard were wounded by the same burst of fire.

McDowell was born on December 31, 1846, in Beattie's Ford, North Carolina to Robert Irvin McDowell and Rebecca Brevard.

In culture
A fictional account of McDowell's participation in the Battle of New Market is featured in The Ghost Cadet, a book by Elaine Marie Alphin.

References

External links
 

1846 births
1864 deaths
New Market cadets
People from Iredell County, North Carolina
Virginia Military Institute alumni
Confederate States of America military personnel killed in the American Civil War
Child soldiers in the American Civil War